The annual NCAA Division III Women's Lacrosse Championship tournament has determined the top women's lacrosse team in the NCAA Division III since 1985.

The Middlebury Panthers are the current champions. The College of New Jersey, previously known as Trenton State, is the most successful program with 12 total titles, the most recent coming in 2006.

Champions
See Association for Intercollegiate Athletics for Women Champions for the 1981 and 1982 Division III women's lacrosse champions.

† NCAA vacated the 1992 Trenton State title due to use of an ineligible player during the tournament

Championship Records

† NCAA vacated the 1992 Trenton State title due to use of an ineligible player during the tournament

See also
AIAW Intercollegiate Women's Lacrosse Champions
NCAA Division I Women's Lacrosse Championship
NCAA Division II Women's Lacrosse Championship
NCAA Division III Men's Lacrosse Championship

References

External links
DIII Women's College Lacrosse

Lacrosse, Women's
Division III
Women's lacrosse competitions in the United States
NCAA Division III women's lacrosse